Antioch is an unincorporated community in Jackson Township, Clinton County, Indiana.

Antioch was first settled in 1828.

References

External links

Unincorporated communities in Clinton County, Indiana
Unincorporated communities in Indiana
1828 establishments in Indiana
Populated places established in 1828